Arthroleptis spinalis, the Tanganyika screeching frog, is a species of frog in the family Arthroleptidae. It is endemic to the western shore of Lake Tanganyika in the Democratic Republic of the Congo.

References

spinalis
Endemic fauna of the Democratic Republic of the Congo
Taxonomy articles created by Polbot
Amphibians described in 1919